Sheya is a rural locality (a selo) and the administrative center of Sheinsky Rural Okrug in Suntarsky District of the Sakha Republic, Russia, located  from Suntar, the administrative center of the district. Its population as of the 2002 Census was 866.

References

Notes

Sources
Official website of the Sakha Republic. Registry of the Administrative-Territorial Divisions of the Sakha Republic. Suntarsky District. 

Rural localities in Suntarsky District